Flashback was a steel roller coaster made by Intamin of Switzerland. The coaster was located in the Six Flags Plaza area of Six Flags Magic Mountain in Valencia, California. The model of the ride, a Space Diver coaster, was intended to be mass-produced, however, Flashback was the only installation.

History

Six Flags Great America (1985–1987)
Flashback first opened in 1985 at Six Flags Great America (at Gurnee, Illinois) as Z-Force. It was a prototype Space Diver that was purchased from the Intamin testing facility. In 1987, the ride was closed. The site was later used for a Bolliger & Mabillard stand-up roller coaster named Iron Wolf.

Six Flags Over Georgia (1988–1991)
Following the ride's closure at Six Flags Great America, it was relocated to Six Flags Over Georgia, west of Atlanta. On July 18, 1989, an 11-year-old boy from Talladega, Alabama, became unconscious while riding Z-Force. Park staff performed CPR, but the victim was pronounced dead after being taken to HCA Parkway Medical Center. An autopsy failed to pinpoint the cause of death.
The ride opened in 1988 before closing three seasons later in 1991.

Six Flags Magic Mountain (1992–2007)
The ride's final relocation was to Six Flags Magic Mountain in California. As part of the relocation, the ride was renamed from Z-Force to Flashback. It opened at the park in 1992.

Flashback gained a reputation as a painful ride experience. Riders would hit their heads on the uncomfortable restraints during each hairpin dive. In June 1995, Six Flags Magic Mountain opened a water park named Hurricane Harbor right next to the ride. Flashback was so noisy that the lifeguards were distracted, as well as the guests at Hurricane Harbor. Following these complaints, the ride would remain closed from May to September beginning in 1996.

The ride was left standing but not operating from 2003 until 2007. On January 23, 2007, the park announced that Flashback would be removed along with Psyclone. Originally, the park stated that Flashback may be re-built within the park for 2008, however it was dismantled and scrapped in December 2007.

Summary

Ride experience
Flashback was the world's only hairpin-drop roller coaster, with 6 head-over-heels dives and a 540-degree upward spiral. It was also the only Space Dive coaster ever to be built. The drops were severe, producing a free-fall experience on the plunges; fast steel switchbacks connected the turns just before trains flew into the gravity-defying upward spiral.

Track 
Throughout its life, Flashback's track was painted blue with white supports. The style of track used on this coaster became the signature track style of coasters built by Bolliger & Mabillard.

Trains
The ride featured three trains, each with five cars. Each car featured riders arranged 4 across for a total of 20 riders per train. The trains were manufactured by Giovanola. When Flashback was known as Z-Force, the trains were painted all blue with a navy blue stripe running down on the sides of the train. The restraints were also blue.  After its relocation to Six Flags Magic Mountain, Flashback's trains were repainted red with a white chassis and a white stripe on the sides of each car. The restraints were also repainted orange.

References

External links
Flashback at the Roller Coaster DataBase
Flashback photos on Ultimate Rollercoaster
Flashback Removal Photos

Former roller coasters in California
Former roller coasters in Georgia (U.S. state)
Roller coasters operated by Six Flags
Six Flags Magic Mountain
Six Flags Great America
Six Flags Over Georgia
Roller coasters introduced in 1985
Roller coasters introduced in 1988
Amusement rides that closed in 1987
Amusement rides that closed in 1990
1985 establishments in California